Computed Corpuscle Sectioning is a general method for determining the volume, profile area, and perimeter of a slab section of any computer-modeled three-dimensional object in any orientation and at any position. It was originally developed as a model of cell nuclei in a tissue section in conjunction with the Reference Curve Method for correcting ploidy measurements by image analysis in a tissue section, but it is useful for evaluating any algorithm that corrects ploidy measurements for the effect of sectioning.  Computed Corpuscle Sectioning has obvious pertinence to stereology, but has not been exploited in that field.  The patents on this method (U.S. Patent numbers 5,918,038, 6,035,258, and 6,603,869) are no longer in force.

References 

Freed JA. Possibility of correcting image cytometric DNA (ploidy) measurements in tissue sections:  Insights from computed corpuscle sectioning and the reference curve method.  Analyt Quant Cytol Histol 19(5):376-386, 1997. 
Freed JA.  Improved correction of quantitative nuclear DNA (ploidy) measurements in tissue sections.  Analyt Quant Cytol Histol 21(2):103-112, 1999.
Freed JA.  Conceptual comparison of two computer models of corpuscle sectioning and of two algorithms for correction of ploidy measurements in tissue sections.  Analyt Quant Cytol Histol 22(1): 17-25, 2000.  
"A general method for determining the volume and profile area of a sectioned corpuscle", U.S. Pat. No. 5,918,038 issued 6/29/99 to Jeffrey A. Freed. 
"Method for correction of quantitative DNA measurements in a tissue section", U.S. Pat. No. 6,035,258 issued 3/7/00 to Jeffrey A. Freed. 
“Use of perimeter measurements to improve ploidy measurements in a tissue section”, U.S. Pat. No. 6,603,869 issued 8/5/03 to Jeffrey A. Freed. 

3D computer graphics
Medical imaging